Tolstoj may refer to:

People 
 Leo Tolstoy (1828–1910)

Other 
 Tolstoj (crater)
 Tolstoj quadrangle
 2810 Lev Tolstoj

See also 

 Tolstoy (disambiguation)